Nilave Malare is a 1986 Indian Tamil-language drama film, directed by Chandrasekhar and produced by Sajan. The film stars Baby Shalini, Nadhiya, Rahman and Manorama. The movie was later dubbed into Malayalam as Priyamvadakkoru Pranayageethom.

Cast 
Baby Shalini as Priya
Nadhiya  as Janaki and Sheela
Rahman as Vijay
Manorama
Senthil
Rajesh as Raghu
S. A. Chandrasekhar as Doctor
M. N. Rajam as Raghu's aunt

Soundtrack 
Tamil version
The music was composed by M. S. Viswanathan. The soundtrack was released under label Saregama.

Malayalam version
The music was composed by M. S. Viswanathan and lyrics were written by Poovachal Khader.

Reception
Jayamanmadhan of Kalki wrote Chandrasekhar, who was arguing about court, murder and law, suddenly changed his track to  family and love, which is to be welcomed and also appreciated the performances of Rahman, Baby Shalini and Viswanathan's music.

References

External links 
 

1980s Tamil-language films
1986 films
Films scored by M. S. Viswanathan
Films directed by S. A. Chandrasekhar
Indian drama films